The Tarim Desert Highway, also known as the Cross-Desert Highway (CDH) or Taklamakan Desert Highway, crosses the Taklamakan Desert in China. There are now three highways: two main highways and one branch highway.

Lunmin Highway
The Lunmin Highway links the cities of Luntai on National Highway 314 and Minfeng on National Highway 315, on the northern and southern edges of the Tarim Basin.

History
Construction on the highway began in 1993 because of expansion in the petroleum industry, requiring fast shipping across the Taklamakan desert.  Construction was completed in 1995.

Maintenance
To prevent the shifting sands from covering the highway, bushes and other vegetation were planted next to the highway to anchor the sand with their roots. A massive irrigation system was constructed to pump water for the vegetation along the highway. Every four kilometers along the road there is a maintenance shed for keeping a belt of shrubs along the road irrigated, which protects the road against moving sand.

Services
At the halfway point along the desert highway, there are a few restaurants and a gas station. Except for pump house maintenance workers, the region is entirely uninhabited.

Gallery of Lunmin Highway

Taqie Highway
It opened in 2002, and is called the autonomous region's S233 Highway.

Ahe Highway

References

External links

 Xinjian Impressions: Tarim Desert Highway (in Chinese) 

Roads in China
Transport in Xinjiang
Tarim basin